Five Nations may refer to:

Art, entertainment, and media
 Five Nations (accessory), a book about the fictional Eberron location
 Five Nations of the Eberron Campaign Setting, a fictional location
 The Five Nations, a 1903 poetry collection by Rudyard Kipling (1865–1936)
 Five Nations, a real-time strategy video game published by Silver Forge Studios

Organizations
 The original five nations of the Iroquois Confederacy, a union of Native Americans
 Five Civilized Tribes
 Five Nations Golf Club, a golf course in Belgium

Rugby
 Asian Five Nations, a rugby tournament replaced by Asia Rugby Championship
 Pacific Five Nations, a rugby tournament replaced by World Rugby Pacific Nations Cup
 Five Nations Championship, a UK/Europe rugby tournament replaced by Six Nations Championship